The Grenville dike swarm is a large Proterozoic dike swarm in the Canadian provinces of Ontario and Quebec. It is one of the several major magmatic events in the Canadian Shield and it possibly formed 590 million years ago along a triple junction that might have been related to a mantle plume.

The Ottawa-Bonnechere Graben is associated with the Grenville dike swarm, as some of its features date from that time.

See also
Volcanism of Canada
Volcanism of Eastern Canada
Grenville orogeny

References

Dike swarms
Igneous petrology of Ontario
Igneous petrology of Quebec
Proterozoic magmatism